Lake Rubikiai is a lake in Anykščiai district municipality, Lithuania. It is famous for its 13 (or 16) islands (Pertako, Bučinė, Aukštoji, Česnakinė, Liepinė, Didžioji, and others) that cover . Among the settlements located on the shores of the lake, Rubikiai village is the largest. Anykšta rivulet, the namesake of Anykščiai and left tributary of Šventoji River, flows from the lake. In 1960 Lake Rubikiai was declared a landscape reserve and now is part of Anykščiai Regional Park. There are several campsites where tourists are welcome to put up tents or rent kayaks. Every year since 1984 Lake Rubikiai hosts a regatta on the Joninės day.

References

  Rubikių ežeras. Anykščiai Regional Park.

Rubikiai